Jake Kostecki (born 24 January 2000) is a former Australian professional racing driver who competed in the Repco Supercars Championship.

Biography

Junior Series
Kostecki began his career in karts at the age of 8, in the 2008 Western Australian Karting Championship. By 2011, Kostecki was winning races and in 2013, he came third in the SKUSA SuperNats XVII - TaG Junior sponsored by Russell Karting Specialties.

V8 Touring Car Series (2015)
Kostecki made headlines in 2015 with his announcement of joining the V8 Touring Car series, at the age of 15. Driving an ex-Craig Lowndes Ford Falcon, he finished ninth in the championship that year.

Super2 Series (2016–2019)
Kostecki made the move to the Super2 Series in 2016, where he finished 18th in the championship. His 2017 campaign suffered a major crash at the Sandown round.

Supercars Championship (2019–)

2019
Kostecki along with his cousin, Brodie Kostecki, teamed up in a PIRTEK Enduro Cup wildcard program in 2019 for Kostecki Brothers Racing, entering the Sandown 500, Bathurst 1000 and Gold Coast 600 races. Kostecki Brothers Racing converted a Super2 Series Holden VF Commodore to an updated current spec Holden ZB Commodore. The team qualified 24th at Sandown for Race 28 of the championship, and Jake finished the race in 22nd. For Race 29, his cousin Brodie started in Jake's finishing position of 22nd, and stormed his way to an eighth place finish in a challenging race with mixed weather conditions. For a small team punching above their weight, Kostecki Brothers Racing were praised for their efforts. Jake and Brodie finished 16th in the 161 lap main endurance race.

At the Supercheap Auto Bathurst 1000, Kostecki Brothers Racing qualified 23rd for the 1000 km race. Brodie nearly failed to make the start of the race driving to the grid, with a cool suit drama delay proceedings of the race. The team were not classified as finishers of the race, with a major crash taking them out of the proceedings. After the conclusion of the race, news reports stated that Kostecki Brothers Racing were in a race against time to get their car fixed for the next round at the Gold Coast 600 and ran the risk of not competing at the event.

The car was fixed and repaired in time for the Gold Coast 600. The team qualified 23rd for the first race of the weekend and finished in 18th. For the second race of the weekend, the team qualified 18th and finished in 16th position.

Overall, Kostecki Brothers Racing finished the 2019 PIRTEK Enduro Cup in 24th position with a total of 247 points, 631 points behind winners Jamie Whincup and Craig Lowndes of the Red Bull Holden Racing Team.

Career results

Karting career summary

Career summary

Complete Super2 Series results
(key) (Races in bold indicate pole position) (Races in italics indicate fastest lap)

Stadium Super Trucks
(key) (Bold – Pole position. Italics – Fastest qualifier. * – Most laps led.)

Supercars Championship results

Complete Bathurst 1000 results

References

External links
 Jake Kostecki website 
 

2000 births
Living people
Australian racing drivers
Stadium Super Trucks drivers
Racing drivers from Perth, Western Australia
Supercars Championship drivers
Matt Stone Racing drivers